Hinzelmann or Heinzelmann (sometimes called Luring) was a  kobold in the mythology of northern Germany. He was described as a household spirit of ambivalent nature, similar to Puck (Robin Goodfellow). Like Puck, he would provide good luck and perform household tasks, but would become malicious if not appeased.

Descriptions in mythology
Heinzelmann's myth says that he started haunting the castle Hudemühlen in 1584 after being cast from the forest of Bohemia. At first he was shy, later he was conversing and jesting openly with all inhabitants of the house, including the master. He sang verses, the most repeated one said that evil luck would take his place if he was ever chased out. 

Heinzelmann usually took the form of a congenial child in red velvet.  In one tale he showed his true form to a maid, who fainted; it was that of a small child, around four years of age, stabbed and slashed with two swords.

Some local lore dating back generations puts the Heinzelman in the role of elves, leaving trinkets or candies in the shoes of well-behaved children, when said shoes are left by the door in the days leading up to Christmas.

Popular culture
Hinzelmann appears in the Neil Gaiman novel American Gods, where he protects the town of Lakeside, Wisconsin from economic trouble: in return he enjoys the annual sacrifice of a town's child (though residents remain unaware of the matter). His fictional history describes him as being a god to a tribe of nomads living in the Black Forest before its invasion by the Romans. For the third season of the American Gods television series, the deity was adapted as Ann-Marie Hinzelmann, the local busybody and shop owner portrayed by Julia Sweeney.

Hinzelmann is the primary antagonist of the short piece "A Late Symmer Night's Battle" by Laura Frankos, printed in Turn the Other Chick (ed. Esther Friesner, Baen Books, 2004). He leads an army of kobolds to invade the English fairy kingdom of Oberon and Titania, sometime after the events of A Midsummer Night's Dream.

See also
Heinzelmännchen

References

External links
 
 

Kobolds